Pablo G. Debenedetti is the Dean for Research, the Class of 1950 Professor in Engineering and Applied Science, and a professor of chemical and biological engineering at Princeton University. His research focuses on thermodynamics, statistical mechanics, and computer simulations of liquids and glasses.

Debenedetti was elected a member of the National Academy of Engineering in 2000 for microscopic theory, insight embodied in a scholarly monograph, and application of supercritical and metastable fluids.

Early life and education 
Debenedetti was born in Buenos Aires, Argentina, in 1953. He graduated from the University of Buenos Aires in 1978 with a degree in chemical engineering, and worked as a process development engineer at the De Nora Company in Milan, Italy, between 1978 and 1980. He completed his master's degree in 1981 and his Ph.D in 1985, both in chemical engineering, at the Massachusetts Institute of Technology, where his thesis adviser was Robert C. Reid. He joined the faculty of Princeton University in 1985.

Research and career 
Debenedetti's research focuses on theoretical and computational investigations of the structure, dynamics, thermodynamics, and statistical mechanics of liquids and glasses. He has published over 300 scientific papers. and a book, Metastable Liquids: Concepts and Principles

Debenedetti has made numerous contributions to fundamental understanding of the microscopic structure of supercritical fluids, the theory of nucleation, the theory of hydrophobicity, the glass transition, protein thermodynamics, and the structure and thermodynamics of supercooled water. Using advanced sampling techniques, his group demonstrated computationally the existence of a metastable liquid-liquid phase transition in a molecular model of water. His work has been cited more than 33,000 times.

He served as the chair of the Department of Chemical Engineering from 1996 to 2004 and was the vice dean of the School of Engineering and Applied Science from 2008 to 2013. He was appointed Princeton's Dean for Research in 2013.

Awards and honors 
Debenedetti has received numerous awards and honors.

 Presidential Young Investigator, National Science Foundation, 1987
 Teacher-Scholar Award, Camille and Henry Dreyfus Foundation, 1989
 Guggenheim Fellow, John Simon Guggenheim Memorial Foundation, 1991
 Best Professional/Scholarly Book in Chemistry, Metastable Liquids, Association of American Publishers, 1997
 Professional Progress Award, American Institute of Chemical Engineers, 1997
 Elected to the National Academy of Engineering, 2000
John M. Prausnitz Award in Applied Chemical Thermodynamics, 2001
 Joel Henry Hildebrand Award in the Theoretical and Experimental Chemistry of Liquids, American Chemical Society, 2008
 Elected to the American Academy of Arts and Sciences, 2008
 Distinguished Teacher Award, School of Engineering and Applied Science, Princeton University, 2008
 President's Award for Distinguished Teaching, Princeton University, 2008
 William H. Walker Award, American Institute of Chemical Engineers, 2008
American Association for the Advancement of Science, Fellow, 2011
 Elected to the National Academy of Sciences, 2012
 Fellow, American Institute of Chemical Engineers, 2013
 Institute Lecturer, American Institute of Chemical Engineers, 2013
 Benjamin Garver Lamme Award, American Society for Engineering Education, 2014
 Fellow, American Physical Society, 2015
 Phi Beta Kappa Teaching Award, Princeton University, 2016
 Guggenheim Medal, Institution of Chemical Engineers, 2017
 Alpha Chi Sigma Award, American Institute of Chemical Engineers, 2019

In 2008, he was named one of the 100 chemical engineers of the modern era by the American Institute of Chemical Engineers (AIChE) Centennial Celebration Committee.

Selected publications 

 P.G. Debenedetti, Metastable Liquids. Concepts and Principles. Princeton (1996)
 S. Sastry, P.G. Debenedetti, F. Sciortino and H.E. Stanley, “Singularity-free interpretation of the thermodynamics of supercooled water.” Phys. Rev. E, 53, 6144 (1996).
 S. Sastry, P.G. Debenedetti and F.H. Stillinger, “Signatures of distinct dynamical regimes in the energy landscape of a glass-forming liquid.” Nature, 393, 554 (1998).
 J.R. Errington and P.G. Debenedetti, “Relationship between structural order and the anomalies of liquid water.” Nature, 409, 318 (2001).
 P.G. Debenedetti and F.H. Stillinger, “Supercooled liquids and the glass transition.” Nature, 410, 259 (2001).
 J.C. Palmer, F. Martelli, Y. Liu, R. Car, A.Z. Panagiotopoulos and P.G. Debenedetti, “Metastable liquid-liquid transition in a molecular model of water.” Nature, 510, 385 (2014).
 A. Haji-Akbari and P.G. Debenedetti, “Direct calculation of ice homogeneous nucleation rate for a molecular model of water.” PNAS, 112, 10582 (2015).
 P.G. Debenedetti, F. Sciortino and G.H. Zerze, “Second critical point in two realistic models of water.” Science, 369, 289 (2020).

References 

Living people
American chemical engineers
American biologists
Princeton University faculty
1953 births